The 2015–16 Cincinnati Bearcats women's basketball team will represent the University of Cincinnati during the 2015–16 NCAA Division I women's basketball season. The season marks the third for the Bearcats as members of the American Athletic Conference. The Bearcats, led by seventh year head coach Jamelle Elliott, plays their home games at Fifth Third Arena. They finished the season 8–22, 4–14 in AAC play to finish in a tie for ninth place. They lost in the first round of the American Athletic women's tournament to East Carolina.

Media
All Bearscats games will have an audio broadcast streamed on Bearcats TV. Before conference season home games will also have a video stream on Bearcats TV. Conference home games will rotate between ESPN3, AAC Digital, Fox Sports Ohio, and Bearcats TV. Road games will typically be streamed on the opponents website, though conference road games could also appear on ESPN3 or AAC Digital.

Roster

Schedule and results

|-
!colspan=12 style=""| Exhibition

|-
!colspan=12 style=""| Non-conference regular season

|-
!colspan=12 style=""| AAC regular season

|-
!colspan=12 style="background:#000000;"| American Athletic Conference Women's Tournament

See also
2015–16 Cincinnati Bearcats men's basketball team

References

External links
Official website

Cincinnati
Cincinnati Bearcats women's basketball seasons